Capricorn FM is a commercial radio station in the Limpopo province, South Africa.

Overview
The Capricorn FM station broadcasts in the FM frequency range and streams on the internet.  The station broadcasts on the following frequencies:

 96.0 FM in Mokopane/Polokwane
 98.0 FM in Hoedspruit
 105.4 FM in Louis Trichardt
 89.9 FM in Sibasa
 97.6 FM in Tzaneen

The broadcasting format carries 70% music and 30% talk shows, featuring a variety of urban genres in R&B, soul, afro-pop, afro-soul, hip-hop, kwaito, house, jazz and gospel.

Its presenters include:

 Dee Nkomo
 Mpho Mashita
 Ms Kulie
 King Bash
 Muthusi Makosholo
 Black Moakamedi
 Dj Complexion
 Ngamula Teecee Chauke
 Vusi Alphaa
 Chris Chuene
 Tlou Tlolane
 Prudence Mabasa
 Aggrey Lichopwa
 Hellen Seabi
 Master Jay
 Wanani Rathanya
 Itumeleng Banda
 Mr Majo
 Lindiwe Manzini
 Mpho Magwabeni
 Hlekani Shikwambana
 Uncle TS.

History
The station is named after the latitudinal line that cuts across Limpopo (Tropic of Capricorn).  The station broadcasts from its studios in Bendor, Polokwane. It was established on 26 November 2007 and has been led by the CEO Simphiwe Mdlalose who represents MSG Afrika Media. Mdlalose and his partner and former talk show host Given Mkhari were part of consortium that competed against a number of contenders for the license to broadcast in Limpopo. Presenters have included Shandu Madima, Karabo Maila, Prudence Mabasa Thabiso Kotane and the Capricorn FM Breakfast Ashifa Shabba, BK.

Target audience
As a commercial radio station, the broadcasting format carries 70% music and 30% talk shows. The idea to cater for an ever diversifying audience was paramount to the decision to broadcast 70% in English and 30% vernacular, incorporating the three dominant ethnic groups in the province (Tshivenda, Sepedi, Xitsonga). Capricorn FM broadcasts 24/7 throughout Limpopo with five transmitters covering the main towns and areas surrounding them.

Content
The station offers adult contemporary content, interspersed with news and views from the station's team of on-air personalities. The music features a variety of urban genres in R&B, soul, afro-pop, Afro-Soul, hip-hop, kwaito, and house, and it also caters for jazz and gospel lovers, described by Capricorn FM as urban jazz and urban gospel. The community is strongly reflected. Exciting competitions form part of the station's day-to-day activities with competitions sponsored by Tastic Rice and Samsung Mobile. The weather and sports news also fills in a substantial percentage of the content provided by Capricorn FM.

Ownership
Capricorn FM is owned by Simphiwe Mdlalose who represents MSG Afrika Media, and his business partner Given Mkhari

Programming

Mondays - Thursdays
0000 - 0300 Soul Connection
0300 - 0600 The Morning Grind
0600 - 0900 On The Go Breakfast
0900 - 1200 The Tailored Experience
1200 - 1500 The Urban Lunch Experience
1500 - 1800 Just Drive
1800 - 2000 Progressive Talk
2000 - 0000 Capricorn FM Express

Fridays 
0000 - 0300 Soul Connection
0300 - 0600 The Morning Grind
0600 - 0900 On The Go Breakfast
0900 - 1200 The Tailored Experience
1200 - 1500 Urban Lunch Experience
1500 - 1800 Just Drive
1800 - 1900 The Sport Precinct
1900 - 2200 The Friday Fiesta
2200 - 0000 Ea Baba Nights

Saturdays 
0200 – 0600: The Rise
0600 – 1000: Saturday Breakfast
1000 – 1400: Urban Hot 40
1400 – 1800: The Saturday Plug
1800 – 2200: The Royal Movement
2200 – 0200: Ea Baba Nights

Sundays 
0200 – 0600: The Rise
0600 – 1000: Sunday Restoration
1000 – 1400: Addictive Sundays
1400 – 1800: Body & Soul
1800 – 2100: The After Glow
2100 – 0000: The Last Gea

Broadcast time
24 hours and 7 days per week.

Listenership figures

References

External links
Capricorn FM website

Radio stations in South Africa
Radio stations established in 2007
Polokwane
Mass media in Limpopo